The Mural Formation is a geologic formation in Alberta. It preserves fossils dating back to the Cambrian period.

See also

 List of fossiliferous stratigraphic units in Alberta

References
 

Cambrian Alberta
Cambrian southern paleotropical deposits